Dakka is an Austronesian language of Sulawesi, Indonesia. It is spoken in the Wonomulyo district of Polewali Mandar Regency, and belongs to the Northern branch of the South Sulawesi subgroup.

References

Languages of Sulawesi
South Sulawesi languages